is a Japanese footballer currently playing as a defender for Ventforet Kofu.

Career statistics

Club
.

Notes

Honours

Club
Ventforet Kofu
 Emperor's Cup: 2022

References

External links

1998 births
Living people
Association football people from Tochigi Prefecture
Sanno Institute of Management alumni
Japanese footballers
Association football defenders
J2 League players
Tokyo Verdy players
Ventforet Kofu players